Phyllocnistis rotans is a moth of the family Gracillariidae, known from Ecuador. It was described by E. Meyrick in 1915.

References

Phyllocnistis
Endemic fauna of Ecuador
Moths of South America